The Great Leap is Taiwanese Mandopop singer-songwriter David Tao's fourth Mandarin studio album. It was released on 10 January 2005 by EMI Music Taiwan.

The track "Susan 說" (Susan Said) was nominated for Top 10 Gold Songs at the Hong Kong TVB8 Awards, presented by television station TVB8, in 2005.

The album was awarded one of the Top 10 Selling Mandarin Albums of the Year at the 2005 IFPI Hong Kong Album Sales Awards, presented by the Hong Kong branch of IFPI.

Track listing

References

External links
  David Tao@Gold Typhoon formerly EMI Music Taiwan

2005 albums
David Tao albums
Gold Typhoon Taiwan albums